The 1859 California gubernatorial election was held on September 7, 1859 to elect the governor of California.

Since the beginning of the 1850s, issues regarding slavery had effectively split the state Democratic Party. Initially divided by pro-slavery Chivalrists and anti-slavery Free Soilers, by 1857, the party had split into the Lecompton and Anti-Lecompton factions. Lecompton members supported the Kansas Lecompton Constitution, a document explicitly allowing slavery into the territory, while Anti-Lecompton faction members were in opposition to slavery's expansion. The violence between supporting and opposition forces led to the period known as Bleeding Kansas. Splits in the Democratic Party, as well as the power vacuum created by the collapse of the Whig Party, helped facilitate the rise of the American Party both in state and federal politics. In particular, state voters voted Know-Nothings into the California State Legislature, and elected J. Neely Johnson as governor in the 1855 general elections.

During the 1859 general elections, Lecompton Democrats voted Latham, who had briefly lived in the American South, as their nominee for governor. Anti-Lecomptons in turn selected John Currey as their nominee. The infant Republican Party, running in its first gubernatorial election, selected businessman Leland Stanford as its nominee. To make matters more complicated, during the campaign, Senator David C. Broderick, an Anti-Lecompton Democrat, was killed in a duel by slavery supporter and former state Supreme Court Justice David Terry on September 13.

Results

References

1859
California
gubernatorial
September 1859 events